See You Next Tuesday is an American deathcore band from Bay City, Michigan. They were signed to Ferret Records, an independent record label based in New Brunswick, New Jersey. The group released two full-length studio albums through Ferret before disestablishing in 2009 due to financial problems and personal overtures. On May 22, 2015, they announced that they would make a one-off appearance to perform at Don't Call It A Fest II on September 12, 2015. Following the performance, the band announced it would extend the reunion and would be reforming.

History
See You Next Tuesday was formed in Bay City, Michigan, in February 2004, the band originally started out as a joke, but when the group found their early live performances went well, they began to take their music seriously. The group released two EPs with their original vocalist, Brandon "Bear" Schroder before his leaving in 2007. After Schroder's departure, Chris Fox, formerly of the metalcore band Flesh and Blood Robot took his place. With this new See You Next Tuesday line-up, they released their debut full-length album Parasite on Ferret Music. According to the band members, the album had to be recorded twice due to the loss of the original recordings in a computer crash. The album, containing 14 tracks, was produced by Andreas Magnusson, and was released on April 3, 2007, to mixed reviews.

They have toured extensively in the United States and Canada with a wide variety of bands, including Coalesce, Daughters, August Burns Red, Chasing Victory, From a Second Story Window, The Number Twelve Looks Like You, Job for a Cowboy, Suicide Silence, Winds of Plague, Despised Icon, Psyopus and The Acacia Strain.

In an interview when asked about the departure of their vocalist Brandon "Bear" Schroder, former bassist Travis Martin explained that he left for health reasons, and directly explained the following:

In 2008, See You Next Tuesday released their second album, Intervals and it peaked at No. 46 on the Billboard Heatseekers chart. On See You Next Tuesday's MySpace profile, they stated that Intervals "may as well be their first album" as they have changed from spastic genre changes to a more focused death metal sound.

Most recently, the band announced that they would be going on indefinite hiatus after their August 16, 2009 show in their hometown. In 2011, the members stated that they expressed interest in continuing See You Next Tuesday, but so far have not made any certain announcement since this time.

On May 22, 2015, the band announced that they would make a one-off appearance to perform at Don't Call It A Fest II on September 12, 2015. Over a week after the performance, they announced they would be reuniting. That same year, the band started their first ever Facebook page and performed a handful of further shows.

On November 15, 2022, the band released their first new song in fourteen years titled "Hey Look, No Crying", and also announced their upcoming third album, Distractions, would be released on February 17, 2023.

Meaning of the name
The phrase "See You Next Tuesday" is a popular slang meaning "cunt", it originates from a humorous backronym which spells out "C U Next Tuesday". 

At first, the band's merchandise held the initials "SYNT", to which the band later changed to "CUNT". Merchandise from the band has the initials "SYNT" and "CUNT" on different material. Fans of the band also will frequently abbreviate the band's name as "CUNT", more often than they will "SYNT".

Discography
Albums
 Parasite (2007)
 Intervals (2008)
 Distractions (2023)
EPs
 This Was a Tragedy (2004)
 Summer Sampler (2005)

Band members
Current lineup
 Drew Slavik − guitar (2004–2009, 2015–present)
 Rick Woods − bass guitar (2005–2006, 2017–present)
 Chris Fox − vocals (2006–2009, 2015–present)
 James Watson − drums (2022–present)

Former members
 Andy Dalton − drums (2004–2008, 2015–2022)
 Brandon "Bear" Schroder − vocals (2004–2006)
 Adam Karpinski − guitar (2004–2006)
 Adam Payne – bass guitar (2004–2005)
 Travis Martin − bass guitar (2006–2008)
 Josh "Kooter" Krueger − bass guitar (2008–2009, 2015–2016)
 Jake Duhaime - drums (2008-2009)

Timeline

References

Heavy metal musical groups from Michigan
Musical groups established in 2004
Musical groups disestablished in 2009
American deathcore musical groups
American mathcore musical groups
Musical quartets
Ferret Music artists
Metalcore musical groups from Michigan